The Hotel Pines is a historic commercial building at the northwest corner of West 5th and Main Streets in Pine Bluff, Arkansas.  It is a large six-story U-shaped masonry structure, with a two-story section filling the center of the U.  The center section has a portico projecting over the sidewalk, with Classical Revival detailing and paired columns for support.  Built in 1913 and in operation as a hotel until 1970, it was Pine Bluff's grandest hotel.

The building was listed on the National Register of Historic Places in 1979.

See also
National Register of Historic Places listings in Jefferson County, Arkansas

References

Hotel buildings completed in 1910
Buildings and structures in Pine Bluff, Arkansas
Hotel buildings on the National Register of Historic Places in Arkansas
National Register of Historic Places in Pine Bluff, Arkansas
Individually listed contributing properties to historic districts on the National Register in Arkansas